Marvic Bermúdez is an Aruban football manager, currently managing Aruba.

Managerial career
In November 2018, Bermúdez was appointed manager of Aruba's under-20 side, following a stint at Aruban Division di Honor club SV Britannia. In 2020, following Martin Koopman's departure, Bermúdez became manager of Aruba.

References

Year of birth missing (living people)
Living people
Aruban football managers
Aruba national football team managers